The year 1518 in science and technology included many events, some of which are listed here.

Astronomy
 May 26 – A Transit of Venus occurs.

Exploration
 May 1 – Juan de Grijalva arrives at the Tabasco region of Mexico.
 Martín Fernández de Enciso publishes his Suma de Geographie in Castile, a summary of world geography incorporating the latest discoveries in the New World.

Mathematics
 Henricus Grammateus publishes Ayn neu Kunstlich Buech in Vienna, containing the earliest printed use of plus and minus signs for arithmetic. He also publishes  and a new musical temperament.
 Adam Ries publishes , describing the use of a calculating board, a kind of two-dimensional abacus, for practical arithmetic.

Medicine
 July – dancing plague, a case of dancing mania, breaks out in Strasbourg.
 September 23 – College of Physicians founded in London.
 Jacopo Berengario da Carpi publishes Tractatus de Fractura Calve sive Cranii in Bologna, the first monograph on neurosurgery.
 Publication of Antonio de Nebrija's Lexicon artis medicamentariae, "which contains the correspondence in vulgar language of the Greek and Latin names of the plants".

Births
 July 3 - Li Shizhen, Chinese physician, pharmacologist and mineralogist (died 1593)

Deaths

References

 
16th century in science
1510s in science